The 1999 Fed Cup was the 37th edition of the most important competition between national teams in women's tennis. In the final, the United States defeated Russia at Taube Tennis Stadium in Stanford, CA, United States, on 18–19 September, giving the Americans their 16th title.

World Group

Participating teams

Draw

World Group II

The World Group II was the second highest level of Fed Cup competition in 1998. Winners advanced to the World Group for 2000, and losers played in the World Group II play-offs.

Date: 17–18 April

World Group II play-offs
The four losing teams from World Group II (Australia, Belarus, Japan and Netherlands) were divided into two pools of four with qualifiers from Zonal Group I. Two teams qualified from Europe/Africa Zone (Romania and Slovenia), one team from the Asia/Oceania Zone (Chinese Taipei), and one team from the Americas Zone (Argentina).

The two top teams from each pool played-off against each, with the winner promoted to 2000 World Group. All other teams were relegated to Zonal Competition in 2000.

Venue: University Sports Centre, Amsterdam, Netherlands (outdoor hard)

Dates: 21–24 July

Pools

Play-off

Americas Zone

 Nations in bold advanced to the higher level of competition.
 Nations in italics were relegated down to a lower level of competition.

Group I
Venue: Buenos Aires T.C., Buenos Aires, Argentina (outdoor clay)

Dates: 13–18 April

Participating teams

Group II
Venue: Costa Rica Country Club, San José, Costa Rica (outdoor hard)

Dates: 23–27 February

Participating teams

Asia/Oceania Zone

 Nations in bold advanced to the higher level of competition.
 Nations in italics were relegated down to a lower level of competition.

Group I
Venue: Thana City Golf Club, Samutpakarn, Thailand (outdoor hard)

Dates: 22–27 February

Participating teams

 
 
 
 
 
 
 Pacific Oceania

Group II
Venue: Thana City Golf Club, Samutpakarn, Thailand (outdoor hard)

Dates: 22–26 February

Participating teams

Europe/Africa Zone

 Nations in bold advanced to the higher level of competition.
 Nations in italics were relegated down to a lower level of competition.

Group I
Venue: La Manga Club, Murcia, Spain (outdoor clay)

Dates: 19–23 April

Participating teams

Group II
Venue: La Manga Club, Murcia, Spain (outdoor clay)

Dates: 26–30 April

Participating teams

References

External links 
 Fed Cup

 
Billie Jean King Cups by year
Fed
1999 in women's tennis